Zengen is a village in Konya Province , Turkey

Its population was 1996 as of 2012 

In 1977 Zengen was declared a belde (township) with a municipality. But in 2014, by the Law act no 6360
it was made a neighborhood of Ereğli.

See also
Burçak Tarlası (song)

References

Villages in Konya Province
Ereğli (Konya) District
Central Anatolia Region